Eridolius elegans is a species of wasp. It is found in Europe.

See also 
 Checklist of UK recorded Ichneumonidae

References 

 Stephens, J.F. (1835) Illustrations of British Entomology. Mandibulata. Vol. VII., Baldwin & Cradock, London. 306 pages

External links 

 Eridolius elegans at eu-nomen.eu

Ichneumonidae
Insects described in 1835